Sido Coelho Jombati (born 20 August 1987) is a Portuguese professional footballer who plays as a right back or centre back for Ebbsfleet United. He has played in the English Football League for Cheltenham Town and Wycombe Wanderers.

Early and personal life
Born in Lisbon to Angola-Guinea parents, Jombati started his football career with his local team in Portugal, Sporting CP, but he was released at the age of sixteen. He was encouraged to come to England by his family, and ended up having a successful trial at Conference National club Exeter City.

Career

Weymouth & Basingstoke Town
His stay at Exeter was brief, only staying there a month, before moving on to Conference South club Weymouth. During the 2005–06 season he helped Weymouth gain promotion to the Conference National finishing as champions. In the summer of 2008 he joined Conference South team, Basingstoke Town. Immediately settled at the Camrose and went on to make 52 appearances, scoring on four occasions, in a variety of positions. The Taunton-based player was named Basingstoke supporters' player of the year but jumped at the chance to join Bath City at the end of the season, so that he could move closer to his family, who lived in Somerset.

Bath City
During his first season at Bath the club earned promotion to the Conference, after beating Woking in the play-off final. Jombati enjoyed another season at Twerton Park, earning the Player of the Season award before moving to Cheltenham Town in the Football League for a nominal fee.

Cheltenham Town
He made his professional debut on 20 August 2011, in the League Two win over Northampton Town, 3–2 at Sixfields.

In May 2014, Jombati left Cheltenham, after the expiry of his contract. Later that month however, he was signed by League Two club Wycombe Wanderers on a two-year contract. 

In December 2019, Jombati was voted for the team of the decade at Cheltenham Town. The vote took place on a Twitter poll and he received 62.5% of the votes showing he was one of the favorite players for the Robins.

Wycombe Wanderers
Jombati earned a two-year deal with Wycombe in May 2014, soon after he scored his first goal for Wycombe in a 4–0 FA Cup win over FC Halifax Town on 8 November 2015.

In May 2018, he signed a new two-year contract with Wycombe Wanderers after making 23 appearances in the promotion winning 2017/18 season, Jombati was rewarded with a new two-year deal  until the end of the 2019–20 season and he proved his worth throughout the club’s first year back in League 1, starring at centre-back for long periods of the campaign.

In July 2020, along with his team, Jombati gained promotion to the Championship with Wycombe Wanderers after they defeated Oxford United in the final, though Jombati did not appear in the final. His contract with Wycombe Wanderers expired at the end of the season and was not renewed.

Oldham Athletic
Jombati signed for League Two side Oldham Athletic in August 2020 on a one-year contract.

Ebbsfleet United
In June 2021, Jombati joined National League South side Ebbsfllet United.

Career statistics

Honours
Bath City
Conference South play-offs: 2010

Wycombe Wanderers
EFL League One play-offs: 2020
EFL League Two third-place promotion: 2017–18

References

External links

1987 births
Living people
Footballers from Lisbon
Portuguese footballers
Association football defenders
Exeter City F.C. players
Weymouth F.C. players
Basingstoke Town F.C. players
Bath City F.C. players
Cheltenham Town F.C. players
Wycombe Wanderers F.C. players
Oldham Athletic A.F.C. players
Ebbsfleet United F.C. players
National League (English football) players
English Football League players
Portuguese expatriate footballers
Expatriate footballers in England
Portuguese expatriate sportspeople in England
Portuguese sportspeople of Angolan descent
Portuguese people of Guinean descent